"Gravity" is a song by American singer Brent Faiyaz and producer DJ Dahi, released as a single on January 29, 2021. It features vocals from rapper Tyler, the Creator. The song is about the complications of fidelity for a superstar, and was created from music education initiative Songs from Scratch. On March 8, 2021, American rapper IDK released a cover of the song.

Composition
The instrumental of the song, produced by DJ Dahi, includes synths, electric guitar (played by guitarist Steve Lacy), "crisp rim shots" and "airy drums", backed by harmonized background vocals and a piano accompaniment. In the chorus, Brent Faiyaz sings about his girlfriend holding him down and waiting him home while the fame has caused them to reevaluate their relationship ("You held me up when I was down and out / But I don't want you waitin' 'round for me"). Faiyaz compares the "force he feels from his girl" to gravity ("She hold me down like gravity"), and Tyler, the Creator raps about how his lover can still count on him despite the consequences of fame. Both Brent and Tyler ask their lovers to move on to someone else so they do not have to keep waiting for them.

Critical reception
Charlie Zhang of Hypebeast wrote that the song "is imbued with a calm soulful groove that emphasizes Faiyaz's distinct R&B-style vocals". Chris DeVille of Stereogum called the song "Woozy and psychedelic without undermining its pop appeal". Jordan Rose of Complex wrote that "the beat is matched perfectly with Brent's vocals and Tyler's verse". Dewayne Gage wrote that the "groovy guitar compliments the mesmerizing bass line" and "the changing pitch of Faiyaz' voice sounds as if Martians have just stepped in the booth to provide ad-libs". He added that the guest verse of Tyler, the Creator makes the track "a timeless-feeling tune about being held down, even if you're in orbit."

Charts

Certifications

References

2021 singles
2021 songs
Brent Faiyaz songs
Song recordings produced by DJ Dahi
Songs written by DJ Dahi
Songs written by Steve Lacy (guitarist)
Songs written by Tyler, the Creator
Tyler, the Creator songs